In linear algebra, an alternant matrix is a matrix formed by applying a finite list of functions pointwise to a fixed column of inputs.  An alternant determinant is the determinant of a square alternant matrix. 

or, more compactly, . (Some authors use the transpose of the above matrix.)

Properties
 The alternant can be used to check the linear independence of the functions  in function space. For example, let   and choose .

 Linear dependence of the columns of an alternant does not imply that the functions are linearly dependent in function space. For example, let   and choose .

 Despite this, the alternant can be used to find a linear dependence if it is already known that one exists. For example, we know from the theory of partial fractions that there are real numbers A and B for which  Choosing    and  we obtain the alternant . Therefore,  is in the nullspace of the matrix: that is, . Moving  to the other side of the equation gives the partial fraction decomposition 

 If  and the functions  are all polynomials, then  divides the alternant determinant for all  In particular, if V is a Vandermonde matrix, then  divides such polynomial alternant determinants. The ratio  is therefore a polynomial in  called the bialternant. The Schur polynomial  is classically defined as the bialternant of the polynomials .

Applications
 Alternant matrices are used in coding theory in the construction of alternant codes.

See also
 List of matrices
 Wronskian

References
 
 
 

Matrices
Determinants